Rajasekara is a surname. Notable people with the surname include:

Niluka Geethani Rajasekara (born 1982), Sri Lankan long-distance runner
M. Rajasekara Murthy (1922–2010), Indian politician

Rajasekara (part of Vellalar group) are often traditionally from Jaffna region in Sri Lanka. From the medieval times till the end of British Raj, Rajasekara were mostly employed as businessmen, shopkeepers, governors, bankers, lawyers, civil administrators, merchants, teachers, as well as were land owners. They are part of the General category in Sri Lanka and well as in Indian Caste system.
Vellalars are believed to be descendants of distant family of Lord Rama who were left in Sri Lanka to establish peace as told by Lord Rama. Hence, they follow Hinduism and worship Lord Rama as their main deity. Every year, Diwali is celebrated among Vellalars to commemorate victory of Lord Rama. They also worship goddess parvati and Lord Shivji.
Vellalars clan has also migrated from Sri Lanka to India recently due to ongoing Civil war.

References

Sinhalese surnames